The 2004 West Oxfordshire District Council election took place on 10 June 2004 to elect members of West Oxfordshire District Council in Oxfordshire, England. One third of the council was up for election and the Conservative Party stayed in overall control of the council.

After the election, the composition of the council was:
Conservative 29
Liberal Democrats 13
Independent 6
Labour 1

Background
After the last election in 2003 the Conservatives controlled the council with 29 seats, while the Liberal Democrats had 12, there were six Independent councillors and the Labour Party had two seats. A total of 54 candidates stood for the 17 seats up for election in 2004, comprising 16 each for the Conservatives and Liberal Democrats, 11 Labour candidates, nine Green Party and two Independents.

Election result
The Conservatives remained in control of the council with 29 councillors, after winning 12 of the 17 seats contested. 13 of the 14 councillors who were standing again were re-elected, with only Conservative councillor James Mills losing his seat in Standlake, Aston and Stanton Harcourt ward to Liberal Democrat Elisabeth Bickley. The Liberal Democrats took four seats and therefore finished with 13 councillors on the council., while all three members of the Conservative council cabinet were re-elected, including the council leader Barry Norton in North Leigh ward.

Conservative Andrew Creery also gained one seat in Witney Central from Labour, after the Labour councillor for the previous 30 years, Ted Cooper, stood down at the election. This reduced Labour to its worst ever position on the council with just one councillor. Meanwhile, independent councillor Derrick Millard retained his seat in Stonesfield and Tackley, to mean there remained six independent councillors. Overall turnout at the election was 45.19%.

Ward results

By-elections between 2004 and 2006

References

2004 English local elections
2004
2000s in Oxfordshire